Grigory Naumovich Chukhray (23 May 1921 – 28 October 2001) was a Ukrainian Soviet and Russian film director and screenwriter. People's Artist of the USSR (1981). He's the father of the Russian film director Pavel Chukhray.

Early life
Grigory Chukhray was born in Melitopol (modern-day Zaporizhzhia Oblast of Ukraine) to Red Army soldiers Naum Zinovievich Rubanov and Claudia Petrovna Chukhray. He was of Ukrainian origin. His parents divorced when he was three years old. He was raised by a stepfather, Pavel Antonovich Litvinenko, the head of kolkhoz. His mother Claudia Chukhray took an active part in the collectivization and dekulakization of the Ukrainian SSR, then worked as an investigation officer at militsiya.

In 1939, he was drafted to the army. A decorated veteran of World War II, Chukhray's wartime experiences profoundly affected him and the majority of his films. He served in the 229th separate communications battalion of the 134th Infantry Division (later part of the 19th Army). He fought at the Southern, Stalingrad and Don Fronts. From 1943 on, he served in airborne troops at the 1st, 2nd and 3rd Ukrainian Fronts and took part in operation "Dnipro Troopers". He was wounded three times. In 1944, he joined the Communist Party.

Career
At war's end, he studied filmmaking at VGIK, the course led by Sergei Yutkevich and Mikhail Romm, and then developed his skills as a director's assistant at the Kiev Film Studio. By the mid-1950s, he began writing and directing his own films at the Mosfilm studio, gaining cinematic recognition outside the Soviet Union at the 1957 Cannes Film Festival with his film The Forty-First (1956).

Chukhray directed and co-wrote Ballad of a Soldier (1959). Around the themes of love and the tragedy of war, the film received acclaim at home, earning the Lenin Prize. It was heralded internationally for both its story and cinematic technique. At the 1960 Cannes Film Festival it was awarded a special jury prize for "high humanism and outstanding quality." Ballad of a Soldier premiered in the United States in 1960 at the San Francisco International Film Festival. The film won the Festival's Golden Gate Award, for Best Picture and for Best Director for Grigory Chukhray. Playing worldwide, the following year, it earned the BAFTA Award for Best Film. Grigory Chukhray and script co-writer Valentin Yezhov were also nominated for the 1961 Academy Award for Best Original Screenplay.

Chukhray's next film was Clear Skies (1961). It told the story of a Soviet pilot who had survived Nazi imprisonment during the war, but was accused of spying. It was one of the first Soviet films to deal with some of the repressive practices under the Soviet leadership of Joseph Stalin. It won the Grand Prix (in a tie with Kaneto Shindo's The Naked Island) at the 2nd Moscow International Film Festival. Two years later Chukhray served as the President of the Jury at the 3rd Moscow International Film Festival.

Between 1966 and 1971, Chukhray headed the director's courses at VGIK. In 1965, he founded and headed the Experimental Studio at Mosfilm that produced such films as White Sun of the Desert (1970), The Twelve Chairs (1971), Ivan Vasilievich: Back to the Future (1973), A Slave of Love (1976), and other popular movies. He also served as a member of the State Committee for Cinematography between 1964 and 1991.

In 1984, Chukhray directed his final Soviet film, together with Yuri Shvyryov: I'll Teach You to Dream. In 1992—1993, he and Rolf Schübel co-directed Todfeinde. Vom Sterben und Überleben in Stalingrad, a joined Russian-Germany documentary in two parts about the Battle of Stalingrad. In this film Chukhray as well as other Russian and German survivors told about their experiences during the battle.

In 1994, Chukhray was awarded a Nika Award for his lifetime contribution to cinema. In 2001, he published two volumes of memoirs entitled My War and My Cinema, dedicated to his war experience and his work in cinema, respectively.

He was married to Iraida Chukhray (née Penkova), a teacher of Russian language and literature. They had two children: Pavel Chukhray (born 1946), a Russian director, and Elena Chukhray (born 1961), an expert in film studies.

Grigory Chukhray died of heart failure in Moscow in 2001 at the age of eighty. He was buried at the Vagankovo Cemetery.

Honours and awards
People's Artist of the RSFSR
People's Artist of the USSR
Order "For Merit to the Fatherland", 4th class
Order of the Patriotic War, 1st class
Order of the Patriotic War, 2nd class
Three Orders of the Red Banner of Labour
Order of the Red Star
Medal "For the Defence of Stalingrad"
Medal "For the Victory over Germany in the Great Patriotic War 1941–1945"
Medal "For the Capture of Vienna"
Jubilee Medal "Twenty Years of Victory in the Great Patriotic War 1941–1945"
Jubilee Medal "Thirty Years of Victory in the Great Patriotic War 1941–1945"
Jubilee Medal "In Commemoration of the 100th Anniversary of the Birth of Vladimir Ilyich Lenin"
Nika Award

Filmography

References

External links

Ballad of a Film-Director: Grigori Chukhrai

1921 births
2001 deaths
People from Melitopol
Communist Party of the Soviet Union members
Gerasimov Institute of Cinematography alumni
Academic staff of the Gerasimov Institute of Cinematography
Academic staff of High Courses for Scriptwriters and Film Directors
Bodil Award winners
Nastro d'Argento winners
People's Artists of the RSFSR
People's Artists of the USSR
Lenin Prize winners
Recipients of the Medal of Zhukov
Recipients of the Nika Award
Recipients of the Order "For Merit to the Fatherland", 4th class
Recipients of the Order of the Red Banner of Labour
Recipients of the Order of the Red Star
Personnel of the Soviet Airborne Forces
Russian people of Ukrainian descent
Russian film directors
20th-century Russian screenwriters
Male screenwriters
20th-century Russian male writers
Soviet film directors
Soviet military personnel of World War II
Soviet screenwriters
Ukrainian film directors
Ukrainian screenwriters
Burials at Vagankovo Cemetery